The 2009 Montana State Bobcats football team represented Montana State University as a member of the Big Sky Conference in the 2008 NCAA Division I FCS football season. The Bobcats were led by second-year head coach Rob Ash and played their home games at Bobcat Stadium. They finished the season 7–5 overall and 6–3 in the Big Sky to finish in third place. Demetrius Crawford was the team's leading rusher.

Montana State's four non-conference games are against , an NCAA Division II team from Colorado, at Kansas State and Minnesota, both NCAA Division I Football Bowl Subdivision (FBS) teams, and  a fellow NCAA Division I Football Championship Subdivision (FCS) team.

Schedule

References

Montana State
Montana State Bobcats football seasons
Montana State Bobcats football